The 1st Standing Committee of the Workers' Party of South Korea (WPSK) was elected at the 1st WPSK Congress held in November 1946. It consisted of 14 members and remained active until the merger of WPSK and the Workers' Party of North Korea on 30 June 1949. In between sessions of the Standing Committee, the Political Committee met in its place.

Members

Political Committee(정치위원회)
 Ho Hon as Chairman
 Pak Hon-yong as Vice Chairman
 Yi Ki-sok as Vice Chairman
 Kim Sam-yong(김삼용)
 Yi Chu-ha(이주하)
 Yi Sung-yop(이승엽)
 Ku Chae-su(구재수)
 Kim Yong-am(김용암)

Standing Committee(사무국)
 Ho Hon as Chairman
 Pak Hon-yong as Vice Chairman
 Yi Ki-sok as Vice Chairman
 Kim Sam-yong
 Yi Chu-ha
 Yi Sung-yop
 Ku Chae-su
 Kim Yong-am
 Yi Hyon-sang
 Kang Mun-sok
 Ko Chan-bo
 Yu Yong-jun
 Kim O-song
 Song Ul-su

References

Footnotes

Bibliography

 

1st Central Committee of the Workers' Party of South Korea
1946 in South Korea